Francis J. "Tony" Murphy  (July 1859 – December 15, 1915), was an American Association  catcher who played for the 1884 New York Metropolitans. He appeared in one game on October 15, 1884 and recorded one hit and one run in three at-bats. He remained in the minor leagues through 1889, playing primarily in the Connecticut State League and the New England League.

External links

1859 births
1915 deaths
Major League Baseball catchers
New York Metropolitans players
19th-century baseball players
Newburyport Clamdiggers players
Scranton Miners players
Wilkes-Barre Barons (baseball) players
Baseball players from New York (state)